Bakhsheyis Khanahmad oglu Pashayev (1 May 1936, Agdam District, Azerbaijan – 12 July 1992, Xanabad, Khojaly, Azerbaijan) was a recipient of the National Hero of Azerbaijan who fought in the First Nagorno-Karabakh War.

Early life and education 
Bakhsheish Pashayev was born in Ahmadavar village of Agdam District on 1 May 1939. After graduating from the village school, he went to Technical College of Agriculture. In 1988, after complicating the situation in Karabakh, as well as the assassination of Ali and Bakhtiar, he joined the ranks of the National Movement.

First Nagorno-Karabakh War 
Bakhsheish, who connected his life with the frontline, brought weapons and equipment to the servicemen, risked his life for the safety of civilians. He was one of the most active members of the "Karabakh defense falcons" group. He distinguished himself during the cleaning of the village of Khramort from the Armenian Armed Forces. Being a professional shooter, Bakhsheish, who was called "Aksakal", participated in several battles. Not once went to the exploration in the village of Khanabad, Nakhchivanly, Aranzemin. During the Khojaly tragedy in 1992, he saved dozens of civilians. On November 15, 1991, Pashayev was killed in a fight when the Armenian soldiers attacked the village of Khanabad with large forces.

Honors 
By Decree of the President of Azerbaijan No. 350 dated December 7, 1992 Bakhsheish Pashayev was posthumously awarded the title of the "National Hero of Azerbaijan". He was buried at a cemetery in Aghdam.

See also 
 First Nagorno-Karabakh War
 National Hero of Azerbaijan

References

Sources 
Vugar Asgarov. Azərbaycanın Milli Qəhrəmanları (Yenidən işlənmiş II nəşr). Bakı: "Dərələyəz-M", 2010, səh. 237.

1936 births
1992 deaths
Azerbaijani military personnel
Azerbaijani military personnel of the Nagorno-Karabakh War
Azerbaijani military personnel killed in action
National Heroes of Azerbaijan
People from Agdam District